STV Notícias is a 24-hour television news channel of the Mozambican television network STV (Soico Televisão), the first private Mozambican network which also owns the influential Mozambican newspaper O País (The Nation). It airs in the Portuguese language and it is available in cable and satellite. In Satellite it is available in Southern Africa, including Angola and parts of Europe, including Portugal.

References

24-hour television news channels
Television channels and stations established in 2014
Television channels in Mozambique